Patrick James Connelly (born 1983) is an American politician and former baseball player. He is currently the mayor of Greenville, North Carolina.

Early life and education 
Connelly was born on June 27, 1983 in Beloit, Wisconsin. He graduated from Beloit Memorial High School. Connelly went to East Carolina University, where he majored in finance. He also played as a pitcher on the baseball team at the university. In 2004, he played collegiate summer baseball with the Falmouth Commodores of the Cape Cod Baseball League.

Career

Baseball 
After Connelly graduated from college, he played baseball professionally in the Los Angeles Angels organization for two years.

Politics 
In 2015, Connelly was elected to Greenville's City Council for District 5. He ran for mayor in 2017, after Allen M. Thomas, the previous mayor, resigned due to becoming Executive Director of the North Carolina Global Transpark. He won the election on November 7. The final vote count for him was 5,786, compared to 4,354 votes for Calvin Mercer, 529 for Ernest Reeves, and 37 for Curtis Pulley. He states that his priorities for improvement as mayor will be safety, jobs, and roads — “Those were my top priorities as the District 5 representative, and those will be my top priorities as mayor. … The safety of our citizens can never be overlooked," he says.

In 2019, Connelly was among the delegation of local and state officials involved in welcoming President Donald Trump to Greenville. During the President's rally, large portions of the crowd chanted, "Send her back!" while the President spoke about Rep. Ilhan Omar. Connelly condemned the chant the following day.

References 

Living people
1983 births
People from Greenville, North Carolina
East Carolina University alumni
Mayors of places in North Carolina
North Carolina city council members
East Carolina Pirates baseball players
Falmouth Commodores players
20th-century American politicians
People from Beloit, Wisconsin
North Carolina Republicans
Baseball players from Wisconsin